Ravno is a small village in the Municipality of Dobje in eastern Slovenia. The area is part of the traditional region of Styria and is now included with the rest of the municipality in the Savinja Statistical Region.

References

External links
Ravno on Geopedia

Populated places in the Municipality of Dobje